Christine "Kiki" Caron (born 10 July 1948 in Paris) is a French former backstroke swimmer. She won the silver medal in 100 m backstroke at the 1964 Summer Olympics and the gold medal in the same event at the 1966 European Aquatics Championships. She also participated in the 1968 Summer Olympics where she was the first woman to carry the French flag at the opening ceremony. During her swimming career she won 29 national swimming titles. Her elder sister Annie was also a swimmer and competed at the 1960 Olympics.

After retiring from swimming she acted in two films: Le lys de mer (1969) and Violentata sulla sabbia (1971). In 1998, Caron was inducted into the International Swimming Hall of Fame. In 2005, she was named Chevalier de la Legion of Honour. During the next year she published an autobiography titled Kiki with a preface written by Johnny Hallyday.

See also
 List of members of the International Swimming Hall of Fame

References

1948 births
Living people
Swimmers from Paris
French female backstroke swimmers
Olympic swimmers of France
Swimmers at the 1964 Summer Olympics
Swimmers at the 1968 Summer Olympics
Olympic silver medalists for France
Medalists at the 1964 Summer Olympics
Chevaliers of the Légion d'honneur
European Aquatics Championships medalists in swimming
French film actresses
Olympic silver medalists in swimming
21st-century French women
20th-century French women